Star Without Light may refer to:
 Star Without Light (1946 film), a French drama film
 Star Without Light (1953 film), a Mexican drama film

See also
 Dark Star (disambiguation)
 Black Star (disambiguation)